The Women's 5000 metres event at the 2011 European Athletics U23 Championships was held in Ostrava, Czech Republic, at Městský stadion on 17 July.

Medalists

Results

Final
17 July 2011 / 16:35

†: Yekaterina Gorbunova ranked initially 2nd (15:45.14), but was disqualified later for infringement of IAAF doping rules.
‡: Meryem Erdoğan did not finish, but was disqualified later for infringement of IAAF doping rules.

Intermediate times:
1000m: 2:57.28 Layes Abdullayeva 
2000m: 5:57.76 Layes Abdullayeva 
3000m: 9:06.80 Layes Abdullayeva 
4000m: 12:19.35 Layes Abdullayeva

Participation
According to an unofficial count, 18 athletes from 14 countries participated in the event.

References

5000 metres
5000 metres at the European Athletics U23 Championships
2011 in women's athletics